Belidaphne saldubensis is an extinct species of sea snail, a marine gastropod mollusk in the family Mangeliidae.

Description

Distribution
This extinct marine species was found in Pliocene strata in Spain.

References

 Vera-Peláez, J. L. (2002). Revision de la familia Turridae, excepto Clavatulinae (Gastropoda, Prosobranchia) en el Plioceno de las cuencas de Estepona, Malaga y Velez Malaga (Malaga, S Espana) con la descripcion de 26 especies nuevas. Pliocenica. 2: 176-262

External links

saldubensis
Gastropods described in 2002